Saccharococcus  is a Gram-positive, aerobic, non-spore-formin, heterotrophic, thermophilic and non-motile genus of bacteria from the family of Bacillaceae with one known species (Saccharococcus thermophilus).

References

Further reading 
 
 

 

Bacillaceae
Bacteria genera
Monotypic bacteria genera